The 2014 League of Ireland First Division season was the 30th season of the League of Ireland First Division. The First Division was contested by eight teams and Longford Town won the title. Galway were also promoted.

Teams

Stadia and locations

Personnel and kits
Note: Flags indicate national team as has been defined under FIFA eligibility rules. Players may hold more than one non-FIFA nationality.

Overview
The 2014 First Division featured eight teams. Aside from Shelbourne, who were relegated from the Premier Division, replacing the 2013 First Division champions, Athlone Town, there were two other team changes from the previous season. In 2012 an FAI commissioned report recommended that Galway city and County Galway should be represented in the League of Ireland by a single club or team based at Eamonn Deacy Park. The O'Connor Report also recommended that the Galway United Supporters Trust, Salthill Devon, Mervue United and the Galway Football Association, should work together to form such a club.  Following the conclusion of the 2013 First Division season, both Mervue United and Salthill Devon withdrew from the League of Ireland to make way for a new team known as Galway F.C. This still left another vacancy and in December 2013 Shamrock Rovers F.C. received permission from the FAI to enter their reserve team in the First Division for the 2014 season. 

Each team played each other four times, twice at home and twice away, for a total of 28 matches during the season. Longford Town clinched the title following a resounding 5–0 victory at home to Shamrock Rovers B on 3 October 2014. Longford Town ended a seven season stint in the First Division as they were promoted to the 2015 Premier Division. Galway also secured promotion after defeating UCD in a play off. Shamrock Rovers B withdrew from the First Division after just one season. Rovers decided it was not financially viable to continue fielding two teams in the League of Ireland.

Final table

Promotion/relegation playoffs
The second and third placed First Division teams, Shelbourne and Galway, played off to decide who would play UCD, the eleventh placed team from the Premier Division. The winner of this play off would play in the 2015 Premier Division. 
First Division 

Galway won 4 – 1 on aggregate
First Division v Premier Division  

Galway won 5–1 on aggregate and were promoted to 2015 Premier Division. UCD are relegated to 2015 First Division.

Awards

Top scorers

Player of the Year

Team of the Year

See also
 2014 League of Ireland Premier Division
 2014 League of Ireland Cup

References

 
League of Ireland First Division seasons
2014 League of Ireland
2014 in Republic of Ireland association football leagues
Ireland
Ireland